The 1974 World Modern Pentathlon Championships were held in Moscow, Soviet Union.

Medal summary

Men's events

Medal table

See also
 World Modern Pentathlon Championship

References

 Sport123

Modern pentathlon in Europe
World Modern Pentathlon Championships
World Modern Pentathlon Championships, 1974
International sports competitions hosted by the Soviet Union
Sports competitions in Moscow